The following are lists of former Hindus who no longer identify as such, organized by their current religious affiliation or ideology. 

Buddhism
Christianity
Islam
Sikhism
Irreligious or atheist

See also

List